11 Aquarii is a sun-like star in the zodiac constellation of Aquarius, located 88.5 light years away from the Sun. 11 Aquarii is the Flamsteed designation. It is difficult to see with the naked eye, appearing as a dim, yellow-hued star with an apparent visual magnitude of 6.22.

It is  a G-type main-sequence star with a stellar classification of G1 V. Compared to the Sun, this star has a higher abundance of elements more massive than helium. This indicates it belongs to a class of stars called metal-rich. The star is slightly older than the Sun, but it has slightly more mass and has a larger radius. It is radiating 2.24 times the luminosity of the Sun from its photosphere at an effective temperature of 5,973 K.

References

External links
 
 
 
 
 

G-type main-sequence stars
Aquarius (constellation)
Durchmusterung objects
Aquarii, 011
103682
199960
8041